Saratoga is a 1937 American romantic comedy film written by Anita Loos and directed by Jack Conway. The film stars Clark Gable and Jean Harlow in their sixth and final film collaboration and features Lionel Barrymore, Frank Morgan, Walter Pidgeon, Hattie McDaniel and Margaret Hamilton.

Jean Harlow died before filming was finished, and it was completed using stand-ins. Saratoga was MGM's most successful film of 1937 and became the highest-grossing film of Harlow's career.

Plot 
Bookie Duke Bradley (Clark Gable) stops the bank from taking the stud of Grandpa Clayton (Lionel Barrymore). Carol Clayton (Jean Harlow) calls from England that she is going to marry the wealthy Hartley Madison (Walter Pidgeon). Duke tells her father, Frank Clayton (Jonathan Hale), and Grandpa. Broke, Frank gives Duke the deed to the family farm to pay his gambling debts. At the races, Duke takes bets and meets Hartley and Carol. Duke greets Fritzi (Una Merkel) with a kiss. During a race, Frank collapses and dies.

Carol asks Duke to sell her the farm, but Duke assures her he won't foreclose on Grandpa. They quarrel about her marrying for money. Fritzi tells Duke that her husband Jesse Kiffmeyer (Frank Morgan) is allergic to horses. When Jesse sneezes during an auction, Duke sees to it that this is considered a bid, and Jesse ends up buying a horse that Fritzi wanted. Grandpa tells Duke that Carol is selling her horse, Moonray; Carol tells Duke she needs money to pay him off. Duke bids Hartley up to $14,000 for the horse. Hartley asks Grandpa to train Moonray.

Carol studies horses and wins money from Duke. Tip O'Brien (Cliff Edwards) sings "The Horse With the Dreamy Eyes" with Fritzi, Duke, and Rosetta (Hattie McDaniel), Carol's maid. Carol is friendly with Duke until he asks her to get Hartley betting. Duke calls on Hartley and tells him to help Carol's nerves. Hartley calls Dr. Bierd (George Zucco), who says Carol is emotional and should marry soon or not see Hartley. Duke gets Hartley to bet and win $6,000, telling Tip it is bait. Carol tells Hartley not to bet with Duke, who learns Hartley is leaving. Carol asks Hartley to stay.

At the track, Hartley bets with Duke and loses $5,000. On a train, Duke dines with Fritzi and Jesse, who is jealous. Fritzi knows Duke is in love with Carol, and Duke says he plans to win enough money to marry her. Carol tells Duke she loves him and has broken off her engagement to Hartley. When Duke objects to losing Hartley, she gets angry. At the races, Hartley loses. Hartley hires a new trainer for Moonray. Carol gets Jesse's contract with the jockey Dixie Gordon (Frankie Darro) so Duke will lose, but Fritzi tells Jesse that if Duke wins, he will marry Carol. Dixie is riding Moonray. Grandpa quarrels with the new trainer. The race is a photo finish, but Moonray loses. On a train, Carol and Duke celebrate.

Cast 

 Clark Gable as Duke Bradley
 Jean Harlow as Carol Clayton
 Lionel Barrymore as Grandpa Clayton
 Frank Morgan as Jesse Kiffmeyer
 Walter Pidgeon as Hartley Madison
 Una Merkel as Fritzi
 Cliff Edwards as Tip
 George Zucco as Dr. Harmsworth Bierd
 Jonathan Hale as Frank Clayton
 Hattie McDaniel as Rosetta
 Frankie Darro as Dixie Gordon
 Henry Stone as Hand-Riding Hurley
 Dennis O'Keefe as Second Bidder/Dancer at party (uncredited)

Cast notes:
After the death of Jean Harlow during principal photography, her stand-in Mary Dees, took her place, with her voice dubbed by Paula Winslowe.
 Margaret Hamilton appears uncredited as "Maizie".

Production and reception

Although screenwriter Robert Hopkins originally intended the script to be a vehicle for Harlow, the studio at first attempted to borrow Carole Lombard from Paramount Pictures for the lead role, but could not do so because of contractual difficulties. It was reported that Joan Crawford would star but by 1937, Harlow was reported as being cast. Walter Pidgeon was borrowed from Universal for the film.

Background filming took place in Lexington and Louisville, Kentucky as well as in Saratoga Springs, New York.

Lionel Barrymore tripped over a cable on set, breaking his hip for the second time in two years and reportedly breaking his knee cap. In 1951, he said that he needed a wheelchair because of the damage to his hip.

At the time of filming, Harlow was suffering from myriad health issues and a tumultuous personal life. She was dealing with the aftermath of oral surgery to remove impacted wisdom teeth and had suffered sun poisoning in the months before filming. Unbeknownst to Harlow, she was also dying of renal failure caused by complications of scarlet fever that she contracted as a child. In 1936, she divorced her third husband, cinematographer Harold Rosson, whom she had married a year after her second husband, Paul Bern, died in 1933 by what was later ruled a suicide. During filming, Harlow was in a relationship with William Powell. While she was eager to marry Powell, he was resistant though the two were reportedly engaged.

On May 29, 1937, Harlow collapsed on the set during a scene with Walter Pidgeon. She was taken to Good Samaritan Hospital where, on June 7, she died of renal failure at the age of 26. Although approximately 90% of the film was finished, MGM planned to shelve the footage with Harlow and reshoot her scenes with Virginia Bruce or Jean Arthur. However, Harlow's fans were adamant that her final film be released. MGM acquiesced and shot the remaining Harlow scenes with Mary Dees. Dees was shot from behind or with costumes that obscured her face, playing Harlow's part for the camera, while Paula Winslowe supplied Harlow's voice.

The film was released on July 23, 1937, nearly seven weeks after Harlow's death. Saratoga was one of the year's highest grossing films due in part to Harlow’s death.  Critical reviews were generally positive, despite the reviewers commenting on the sadness of seeing Harlow so soon after her death. Writing for Night and Day in 1937, Graham Greene gave the film a good review, claiming that it demonstrated "more than curiosity value". Greene noted that Harlow's acting achieved a high point in her career, and praised the film as having been "skilfully sewn-up [in such a way that] the missing scenes and shots lend it an air of originality which the correctly canned product mightn't have had: the story proceed[ing] faster, less obviously: the heroine less unduly plugged".

According to MGM records the film earned $2,432,000 in the US and Canada and $820,000 elsewhere, resulting in a profit of $1,146,000.

See also
 Clark Gable filmography
 Lionel Barrymore filmography

References

External links 

 
 
 
 

1937 films
1937 romantic comedy films
American romantic comedy films
American black-and-white films
1930s English-language films
Films directed by Jack Conway
Films shot in Kentucky
Films shot in Los Angeles
Films shot in New York (state)
Films about gambling
American horse racing films
Metro-Goldwyn-Mayer films
Saratoga Race Course
Films with screenplays by Anita Loos
Films scored by Edward Ward (composer)
1930s American films